Ernakuam District has four types of administrative hierarchies:Ernakulam is an important city in Kerala.  The city is one of the fascinadoras destinations in the map of the tourist of Kerala

 Taluk and Village administration managed by the provincial government of Kerala
 Panchayath Administration managed by the local bodies
 Parliament Constituencies for the federal government of India
 Assembly Constituencies for the provincial government of Kerala

Revenue Divisions

There are mainly two revenue divisions namely Fort Kochi and Muvattupuzha.

Taluks
The district has the most number of taluks in the state. District is divided by two revenue divisions with 7 taluks.

 Paravur
 Aluva
 Kunnathunad
 Muvattupuzha
 Kochi
 Kanayannur
 Kothamangalam

Municipal Corporation

Kochi

Municipalities

Ernakulam district has the most number of municipalities in the state.

 North Paravur
 Piravom
 Muvattupuzha
 Koothattukulam
 Perumbavoor
 Aluva
 Angamaly
 Thripunithura
 Kalamassery
 Kothamangalam
 Eloor
 Maradu
 Thrikkakara

Parliamentary Constituencies
 Ernakulam Parliamentary Constituency
 Chalakudy Parliamentary Constituency (partially)
 Idukki Parliamentary Constituency (parts of Muvattupuzha taluk and Kothamangalam taluk)
 Kottayam Parliamentary Constituency (parts of Muvattupuzha and Kanayannur taluk)

Assembly Constituencies
Piravom
Angamaly
Aluva
Kalamassery
North Paravur
Vypeen
Kochi
Ernakulam
Thrikkakara
Thripunithura
Perumbavoor
Kunnathunad
Moovattupuzha
Kothamangalam

Ernakulam (Lok Sabha constituency)
Ernakulam is a Lok Sabha constituency in Kerala.

Assembly segments

Ernakulam Lok Sabha constituency is composed of the following assembly segments:
Paravur
Vypin
Ernakulam
Kochi
Thrippunithura
Thrikkakara
Kalamassery

Members of Parliament
Travancore-Cochin
1951: C.P. Mathew, Indian National Congress

Kerala
1957: A.M. Thomas, Indian National Congress
1962: A.M. Thomas, Indian National Congress
1967: V.V. Menon, Communist Party of India (Marxist)
1971: Henry Austin, Indian National Congress
1977: Henry Austin, Indian National Congress
1980: Xavier Arrakkal, Indian National Congress
1984: K.V. Thomas, Indian National Congress
1989: K.V. Thomas, Indian National Congress
1991: K.V. Thomas, Indian National Congress
1996: Xavier Arrakkal, Independent, supported by Left Democratic Front
1997 (By-Election): Sebastian Paul, Independent, supported by Left Democratic Front
1998: George Eden, Indian National Congress
1999: George Eden, Indian National Congress
2003 (By-Election): Sebastian Paul, Independent, supported by Left Democratic Front
2004: Sebastian Paul, Independent, supported by Left Democratic Front
2009: K.V. Thomas, Indian National Congress
2014: K.V. Thomas, Indian National Congress
2019: Hibi Eden, Indian National Congress

Ernakulam Constituency Gen/By Election Detailed Results
Based on data from Chief Electrol Office, Kerala

Indian general election, 2014

Candidate Profile

The below table provides key information about the candidates from the information declared by them through the affidavits submitted with their nomination.

See also
 Ernakulam
 List of Constituencies of the Lok Sabha
 Indian general election, 2014 (Kerala)

Notes

External links
 Election Commission of India: https://web.archive.org/web/20081218010942/http://www.eci.gov.in/StatisticalReports/ElectionStatistics.asp

Politics of Ernakulam district